The following list of programs are currently broadcast by the Nine Network / 9HD, 9Go!, 9Gem, 9Life and 9Rush as well as their regional affiliates, including WIN, NBN and Imparja as well as catch-up service 9Now. Some affiliate stations have alternate schedules and may air programs at different times.

Currently broadcast on Nine Network

Domestic

News and current affairs

 Local bulletins
 Nine News – local bulletins produced in Syd/Melb/Bris/Adel/Per/Dar/GC, Nightly 6pm-7pm (1956–present)
 Nine Live / Nine's Afternoon News – local bulletin produced in Syd/Melb/Bris/Adel/Per, 4pm-5pm weekdays (2004–2009, 2009–present)
 NBN News – local bulletin produced in Newcastle, Nightly 6pm-7pm (1972–present)
 National programs produced by TCN9 Sydney
 60 Minutes – weekly current affairs program, Sunday evenings (1979–present)
 A Current Affair – daily current affairs program,Mon-Sat weeknights 7pm (1971–1978, 1988–present)
 Nine News: Early Edition – weekdays 5am (1990s–present)
 Nine's Morning News – weekdays 11.30am (1981–present) (local edition also produced in Bris)
 Today – weekdays 5.30am-9am (1982–present)
 Today Extra – weekdays 9am-11:30am, Saturdays 10am-12pm (2012–present) 
 Under Investigation with Liz Hayes (2021–present)
 Weekend Today – weekends 7am-10am (2009–present)
Nine News Late – Sundays 9:30pm (2020–present)
 National programs produced by GTV9 Melbourne
 Nine News: First At Five (Nine's Afternoon News weekend bulletin) – weekends 5pm (2011–present)
 National programs produced by STW9 Perth
 Nine News Late – Weeknights after 10:30pm (Except Fridays) (2020–present)

Variety / Entertainment
 The Hundred with Andy Lee (2021–present)

Reality
 The Block (2003–2004, 2010–present)
 Lego Masters (2019–present)
 Christmas specials (2021-)
 Love Island Australia (2018–2019, 2021–present)
 My Mum, Your Dad (2022–present)
 Parental Guidance (2021–present)
 Married at First Sight (2015–present)
Snackmasters (2021–present)
 Travel Guides (2017–present)

Observational / documentaries
 Bondi Vet: Coast to Coast (2019–present)
 Desert Vet (2019–present)
 Australian Crime Stories (2010–2011 on CI, 2019–present on Nine)
 Emergency (2020–present)
 Mega Zoo (2021—present)
 Million Dollar Murders (2022)
 Paramedics (2018–present)
 RBT (2010–present)
 Taronga: Who's Who in the Zoo (2020–present)

Game shows
 Millionaire Hot Seat (2009–present)

Lifestyle
 Adelady (South Australia) (2015–present)
 Country House Hunters Australia (2020–present)
 Cybershack (2008–present)
 Delish (2017–present on 9Life) Guru Productions
 The Garden Gurus (2002–present) Guru Productions
 Getaway (1992–present)
 Good Food Kitchen (2021–present)
 Luxury Homes Revealed (2016–present on 9Life)
 Postcards (1995–present)
 Ready Set Reno (2016–present on 9Life)
 The Road to Miss Universe Australia (2016–present on 9Life)
 South Aussie with Cosi (South Australia) (2014–present)
 Your Domain (2019–2020)
 Explore TV (2005–present) Guru Productions
 Delish Destinations (2018–present) Guru Productions
 Our State On A Plate (2014–Present)Guru Productions
 Destination WA (2013–present) Guru Productions
 Destination Australia (2022 release) Guru Productions
 Everything Outdoors (2022 release) Guru Productions
 Ready 4 Adventure (2020) Guru Productions

Sports talk
 100% Footy (2018–present)
 Cross Court (2019–present)
 Footy Classified (2007–present)
 Footy QLD (Queensland) (2017–present)
 Footy SA (South Australia) (2014–present)
 Footy WA (Western Australia) (2014–present)
 Friday Night Knock Off (Friday Night Football post-game; 2019–present)
 Future Stars (Victoria & Tasmania) (2009–present)
 Golden Point (Thursday Night Football post-game; 2019–present)
 Sports Sunday (2017–present)
 The Sunday (AFL) Footy Show (1993–present)
 The Sunday (NRL) Footy Show (1993–present)
 The Trade Table (2018–present)
 Women's Footy (2017–present)

Sports

 Cricket: The Ashes and Cricket World Cup
 Golf: U.S. Masters (1990s–2006, 2018–present)
 Rugby league: National Rugby League  (1961–1970, 1988–present) including State of Origin (1983–1989, 1991–present)
 Rugby league: NRL Women's Premiership (2018–present)
 Rugby league: The Knock On Effect NSW Cup and Hostplus Cup (2018–present)
 Rugby union: Super Rugby Pacific (2021–present on 9Gem)
 Rugby union: Super W (2022–present) 9Gem or 9Go!
 Tennis: Australian Open including Hopman Cup, Brisbane International, Sydney International and Hobart International (2019–present), Roland-Garros (2021–present), Wimbledon (1970–2010, 2021–present) and U.S. Open (1980s–2009, 2022–present)

Children's (9Go!)

 Alien TV (2019–present)
 Berry Bees (2019–present)
 Dumbotz (2019–present)
 The Gamers 2037 (2020–present)
 Smashhdown! (2018–present)
 Space Nova (2021–present; shared with ABC ME)

Annual events
 ARIA Music Awards (2001, 2009, 2011 on 9Go!–present),
 Carols by Candlelight (1952–present)
 Gold Week Telethon (2010–present) (Sydney only)

Foreign

Soap opera
 Days of Our Lives (1968–2013 on Nine, 2019-present on 9Gem)
 The Young and the Restless (1974–2007 on Nine, 2019–present on 9Gem)

Drama
 For Life
 Manifest 
 New Amsterdam

Comedy
 Young Sheldon

Reality
 The Bachelor USA (9Life)
 The Bachelorette USA (9Now)
 Botched (2017–present on Nine/9Life)
 Better Late Than Never
 Survivor (2000–2009 on Nine, 2009–2014 on Nine/9Go!, 2015–2020, 2021–present on 9Go!, 2020–present on 9Rush, shared with 10 Play)
 Top Gear (2009–2020 on Nine/9Go!, 2020–present on 9Rush)

Lifestyle
 Antiques Roadshow (2006–2010 on Nine, 2010–present on 9Gem, Shared with ABC)

Observational / documentaries
 David Attenborough Specials (Shared with ABC)
 Who Do You Think You Are?

Game show
 Pointless (2021–present)
 Tipping Point (2019–present)

Children's (9Go!)

 The Amazing World of Gumball (2014–present)
 Bakugan: Battle Planet
 Bakugan: Armored Alliance
 Bakugan: Geogan Rising
 Bakugan: Evolutions
 Barbie Dreamhouse Adventures
 Beyblade Burst (2016–present)
 Care Bears: Unlock the Magic
 Clarence
 Jungle Beat
 Lego City Adventures (2019–present)
 Lego Friends
 Lego Jurassic World: Legend of Isla Nublar
 Lego Monkie Kid
 Lego Nexo Knights
 Lego Ninjago: Masters of Spinjitzu
 Mega Man: Fully Charged
 My Little Pony: Friendship Is Magic (2017–present)
 My Little Pony: Pony Life (2020–present)
 Pokémon (2016–present)
 Polly Pocket
 Power Players
 Power Rangers Dino Fury
 Rainbow Rangers
 Rev & Roll
 Teen Titans Go! (2014–present)
 The Tom and Jerry Show (2014–present)
 Yu-Gi-Oh! Sevens

Preschool (9Go!)

 Earth to Luna!
 Gigantosaurus
 Ricky Zoom (2020–present)
 Spidey and His Amazing Friends (2021–present)
 Sunny Bunnies (2019–present)
 Super Wings (2019–present)
 Transformers: Rescue Bots
 True and the Rainbow Kingdom

Annual events
 Grammy Awards (2023)

Religious
Joyce Meyer: Enjoying Everyday Life (9Gem)
Wesley Impact
Creflo Dollar Ministries
The Incredible Journey Presents
Amazing Facts Presents
In Touch Ministries
Beyond Today
Leading The Way

Upcoming series

Domestic

2022
 Dream Listings (reality)
 Country Home Rescue (lifestyle)
 Missing Persons Investigation (doco)

2023
 The Summit (reality)
 Warnie (drama)
 Big Miracles (reality)
 Australia's Most Identical (reality)
 Gordon Ramsey's Food Stars (reality)
 RPA (1995–2012, Observational / documentaries)
 Human Error (drama)
 Nine News Tasmania (News and current affairs)

TBA
 Celebrity IOU Australia (reality)
 The A List (chat show)

Foreign

2023
 Bakugan: Legends (children's on 9Go!)
 Frozen Planet II (Observational / documentaries)

TBA
 ABBA: Let the Music Speak (special)
 Murder, Lies & Alibis (documentary)

Formerly broadcast

Domestic

News and current affairs

 Business Sunday (1986–2006)
 Extra (1991–2009 in QLD only)
 Financial Review Sunday (2013–2014)
 Inside Story (2014–2016)
 Nine News – regional bulletins produced in Sydney, Melbourne and Brisbane for Southern Cross Austereo throughout Southern NSW, Canberra, Regional QLD, Regional VIC and Tasmania, weeknights 5.30pm-6pm (2017–2021)
 National Nine News: Sunday Morning Edition/Nine's Sunday Morning News (August 2008 – January 2009)
 Nightline (1992–2008, 2009–2010)
 Nine News At 7.00 (August–October 2013 on GEM)
 Nine News Now (2013–2019)
 Sunday (1981–2008)
 This Afternoon (June/July 2009)
 The Verdict (2015)
 The Rebound (2021)

Drama

 After the Verdict (2022)
 The Alice (2005)
 All the Way (1988)
 Amazing Grace (2021)
 Anzacs (1985) 
 Bad Mothers (2019)
 Beaconsfield (2012)
 Bite Club (2018)
 BJ and the Bear (1979)
 Blood Brothers (2011)
 Canal Road (2008)
 Chances (1991–1992)
 Cluedo (1992)
 Colour in the Creek (1985)
 Cops L.A.C. (2010)
 Counter Play (2018–2019 on 9Gem)
 Division 4 (1969–1975)
 Doctor Doctor (2016–2021)
 Emergency (1959)
 Family and Friends (1990–1991)
 Fat Tony & Co. (2014)
 The Feds (1993–1996)
 The Flying Doctors (1986–1991)
 For the Term of His Natural Life (1983)
 Gallipoli (2015)
 The Godfathers (1971–1972)
 Good Guys, Bad Guys (1997–1998)
 The Great Mint Swindle (2012) 
 Halifax f.p. (1994–2002)
 Halifax: Retribution (2020)
 House Husbands (2012–2017)
 House of Bond (2017)
 The House of Hancock (2015)
 Howzat! Kerry Packer's War (2012)
 Hyde and Seek (2016)
 Informer 3838 (2020)
 Kings (1983)
 Law of the Land (1993)
 The Link Men (1970)
 Little Oberon (2005)
 Love Child (2014–2017)
 Luke's Kingdom (1976)
 The Man From Snowy River (1993–1996)
 McLeod's Daughters (2001–2009)
 Murder Call (1997–1999)
 Pacific Drive (1994–1995)
 Paradise Beach (1994–1995)
 The People Next Door (1973)
 Possession (1985)
 Power Games: The Packer-Murdoch War (2013)
 Rescue: Special Ops (2009–2011)
 Schapelle (2014)
 Scorched (2008)
 SeaChange (2019)
 Shannon's Mob  (1975–1976) 
 Silent Number (1974–1976)
 Sea Patrol (2007–2011)
 Snowy (1993) 
 The Spoiler (1972)
 Spyforce (1971–1973)
 Stingers (1998–2004)
 The Strip (2008)
 The Sullivans (1976–1983)
 Tricky Business (2012)
 Twisted Tales (1996)
 Two Twisted (2006)
 Underbelly (2008)
 Underbelly: Badness (2012)
 Underbelly Files: Chopper (2018)
 Underbelly Files: Infiltration (2011)
 Underbelly Files: Tell Them Lucifer was Here (2011)
 Underbelly Files: The Man Who Got Away (2011)
 Underbelly: The Golden Mile (2010)
 Underbelly: Razor (2011)
 Underbelly: Squizzy (2013)
 Underbelly: A Tale of Two Cities (2009)
 Underbelly: Vanishing Act (2022)
 Waterloo Station (1983)
 Water Rats (1996–2001)
 Wicked Love: The Maria Korp Story (2010)
 The Young Doctors (1976–1983)
 Young Lions (2002)

Comedy

 Ben Elton Live From Planet Earth (2011)
 Comedy Inc (2003–2007)
 Commercial Breakdown (2007–2009)
 Flat Chat (2001)
 Hamish and Andy's Gap Year (2011–2014)
 Hamish and Andy's “Perfect Holiday” (2019)
 Here Come the Habibs (2016–2017)
 The Joy of Sets (2011)
 Just for Laughs (2007)
 Magda's Funny Bits (2006)
 Merrick & Rosso Unplanned (2003–2004)
 Monster House (2008)
 The Nation (2007)
 Surprise Surprise (2000–2001)
 Surprise Surprise Gotcha (2007)
 True Story with Hamish & Andy (2017–2018)

Variety / Entertainment

 20 to One (2005–2011 as 20 to 1, 2016–2017)
 Accidental Heroes (2020)
 Adelaide Tonight (1959-1970s)
 Australia's Funniest Home Videos (1990–2014)
 Australia's Funniest Home Videos: World's Funniest Videos (2009)
 Australia's Naughtiest Home Videos (1992, 2008)
 Best of the Best (2009)
 Between the Lines (2011)
 Big Questions (2006)
 The Boss is Coming to Dinner (2010)
 The Catch-Up (2007)
 Celebrity Golf Shoot-Out (2006)
 Celebrity Singing Bee (2007–2009)
 The Don Lane Show (1975–1982)
 Entertainment Tonight Australia (early 1990s–late 1990s)
 The Great Weight Debate (2006)
 Hey Hey It's Saturday (1971–1999, 2010)
 Hey Hey It's Saturday: The Reunion (2009)
 The Best And Worst Of Red Faces (1992, 1993, 1994, 1995, 2006)
 Gonged But Not Forgotten: Australia's Best & Worst Of Red Faces (1998–2000, 2007–2008)
 In Brisbane Tonight (1959-1960s)
 In Melbourne Tonight (1957–1970, 1996–1998)
 Micallef Tonight (2003)
 The Mick Molloy Show (1999)
 The Midday Show (1985–1998)
 Mornings With Kerri-Anne (2002–2011)
 Movie Juice (2014–2016 on Ten; 2017–2018 on Nine)
 My Kid's a Star (2008)
 The Real Hustle: Australia (2010)
 The Robbie DeVine Show (2015)
 Rove (1999, moved to Ten 2000–2009)
 Russell Gilbert Live (2000)
 Russell Gilbert was Here! (2001)
 StarStruck (2000)
 StarStruck (2005)
 Strassman
 Sydney New Year's Eve Fireworks (1996–2006, moved to Ten 2006–2009, Nine 2009–2013, moved to ABC 2013–present)
 Talkin' 'Bout Your Generation (2009–2012 on Ten, 2018–2019 on Nine)
 The Tonight Show (1957–1970)
 Top Gear Australia (2010–2011)
 Warnie (2010)
 You're Back in the Room (2016)

Lifestyle

 Backstage Pass (2005)
 Backyard Blitz (2000–2007)
 Battlefronts (2008)
 The Boat Show
 Burke's Backyard (1987–2004)
 The Car Show (2003–2008)
 Changing Rooms (1995–2005)
 Domestic Blitz (2008–2010)
 Eat Well For Less (2018)
 Eye on Australia (1989–1990)
 Fresh (2000–2009)
 Good Medicine (1993–2002)
 Helloworld (2018–2019 on Nine, 9Life and 9Now) (screening on Seven from series 2 onwards)
 Holidays for Sale (2008)
 Hot Property (2010–2013)
 I Can Change Your Life (2005)
 Location, Location (1996–2004)
 Looking Good (1993–1995)
 Money (1993–2002)
 Money for Jam (2009)
 Our House (1993–2001)
 Random Acts of Kindness (2009–2010)
 Second Chance (2009)
 Secret Millionaire: Australia (2009–2010)
 Shopping for Love (2005/2006)
 Speed Machine
 Talking Married (2018–2019 on 9Life)
 Things To Try Before You Die (2007)
 Turn Back Your Body Clock (2006)
 Unreal Estate (2016)
 What's Cooking? (1991–1999)
 What's Good For You (2006–2009)

Reality

 The Apprentice Australia (2009)
 Aussie Ladette to Lady (2009)
 Australian Ninja Warrior (2017–2022)
 Australian Survivor (2002, aired on Seven Network in 2006, Network Ten 2016–present)
 Australia's Got Talent (2006–2012 on Seven, 2013, 2016)
 Australia's Perfect Couple (2009)
 Beauty and the Geek Australia (2009–2014 on Seven, moved to Nine 2021–2022)
 Big Brother (2001–2008 on Ten, 2012–2014)
 The Briefcase (2016)
 Buying Blind (2018)
 The Celebrity Apprentice Australia (2011–2013, 2015, 2021–2022)
 Celebrity Circus (2005)
 Celebrity Overhaul (2004–2005)
 The Chopping Block (2008)
 Date Night (2018)
 Excess Baggage (2012)
 The Farmer Wants a Wife (2007–2012, 2016)
 The Great Australian Bake Off (2013, moved to LifeStyle Food 2015–present)
 HomeMADE (2009)
 The Hotplate (2015)
 The Last Resort (2017)
 The Lost Tribes (2007)
 The NRL Rookie (2016 on 9Go!)
 Overhaul (2006)
 Reno Rumble (2015–2016)
 Skating on Thin Ice (2005)
 Top Design Australia (2011)
 Family Food Fight (2017–2018)
 Torvill and Dean's Dancing on Ice (2006)
 The Voice (2012–2020, moved to Seven in 2021)
 The Voice Kids (2014)
 When Love Comes To Town (2014)

Observational / documentaries

 50 Years 50 Shows (2005, 2006)
 50 Years 50 Stars (2006)
 50 Years of Television News (2006)
 AFP: Australian Federal Police (2011–2012)
 Amazing Medical Stories (2008–2009)
 Animal Embassy (2020)
 Animal Emergency (2008) (GEM 2010–2011)
 Animal Hospital (1997–2001)
 Australia Behind Bars (2022)
 Australian Druglords (2010)
 Australian Families of Crime (2010)
 Australian Geographic (2007–2008)
 Australia's Most Wanted (1999, aired on Seven 1989–1994, 1997–1998)
 Big (2011)
 The Big Fella (2006)
 City of Evil (2018)
 The Code (2007)
 Colour of War: The Anzacs
 Crime and Justice (2007)
 Customs (2009–2010)
 Driving Test (2018)
 The Embassy (2014–2018)
 The Enforcers (2010)
 Fire 000 (2008)
 The Gift (2007–2009)
 In Conversation with Alex Malley (2016–2017)
 In Their Footsteps (2011)
 Inside the Human Body (2010) (GEM 2011–2012)
 The Lost Tribes (2007–2008)
 Hot Property (1999–2000 on Seven, moved to Nine 2010–2013)
 Kings Cross ER: St Vincent's Hospital (2012–2015)
 Meet the Hockers (2017 on 9Go!)
 Missing Persons Unit (2009)
 Missing Pieces (2009)
 Murder Calls Australia (2017)
 Murder, Lies & Alibis (2019)
 Ocean's Deadliest (2007)
 Operation Thailand (2017)
 Outback Wrangler (2016–2017) (originally broadcast on National Geographic in 2011)
 The Politically Incorrect Parenting Show (2010)
 Ralph TV (2007)
 Ready for Take Off (2015–2016)
 Rescue 911 (1990s)
 Royal Flying Doctor Service (2007)
 Search and Rescue (2008)
 Send in the Dogs Australia (GEM 2011, 2013–)
 Sensing Murder (2008) (GEM 2011–present)
 Sudden Impact (2008)
 This Is Your Life (1995–2005, 2008, 2011)
 This Time Next Year (2017, 2019)
 Trimbole: The Real Underbelly (2009)
 Trouble in Paradise (2009)
 The Waiting Room (2008)
 Weddings (10 years on Special) (2008)
 What a Year (2006–2007, now screening on GEM 2011)
 Who Killed Harold Holt? (2007)
 You Saved My Life (2009)
 Young Doctors (2011)

Game shows

 1 vs. 100 (2007–2008)
 All About Faces (1971)
 Ampol Stamp Quiz (1964–1965)
 Bert's Family Feud (2006–2007)
 The Better Sex (1978)
 The Big Game (1966)
 Big Nine (1969–1970)
 Blankety Blanks (1985–1986, 1996)
 Burgo's Catch Phrase (1997–2001, 2002–2004)
 Cash Bonanza (2001)
 The Celebrity Game (1969)
 Celebrity Squares (1975–1976)
 Clever (2006)
 Concentration (1950s–1967)
 Crossfire (1987–1988)
 Do You Trust Your Wife? (1957–1958)
 Don't Forget Your Toothbrush (1995)
 Double Your Dollars (1965)
 Download (2000–2002)
 Fairway Fun (1960s)
 Family Feud (1977–1984)
 Fear Factor (2002)
 Ford Superquiz (1981–1982)
 Free for All (1973)
 Gambit (1974)
 The Golden Show (1960s)
 Guess What? (1992–1993)
 Happy Go Lucky (1961)
 Hole in the Wall (2008)
 Initial Reaction (Nine Network 2000)
 It Could Be You (1960–1967, 1969, 1982)
 Jackpot (1960–1961)
 Jigsaw (1960s)
 Keynotes (1964, 1992–1993)
 Let's Make a Deal (1968–1969, 1977)
 Letter Charades (1967)
 Little Aussie Battlers (1998)
 The Lucky Show (1959–1961)
 Match Mates (1981–1982)
 The Mint (2007–2008)
 The Million Dollar Drop (2011)
 Million Dollar Wheel of Fortune (2008)
 My Generation (1995–1996)
 Name That Tune (1956–1957, 1975)
 The Newlywed Game (1987)
 Now You See It (1998–1999)
 Pass the Buck (2002)
 Play Your Hunch (1962–1964)
 Power of 10 (2008)
 The Price Is Right (1958, 1993–1998, 2003–2005)
 Quizmania (2006–2007)
 Sale of the Century (1980–2001)
 Say G'day (1987)
 Say When!! (1962–1964)
 Shafted (2002)
 Show Me the Money 
 The Singing Bee (2008)
 Spending Spree (1971–1976)
 Split Second (1972–1973)
 Strike It Lucky (1994)
 Supermarket Sweep (1992–1994)
 Surprise Package (1961)
 Take the Hint (1962–1966)
 Tell the Truth (1959–1965)
 Temptation (2005–2009)
 Tic-Tac-Dough (1960–1964)
 The Tommy Hanlon Show (1967–1968)
 The Weakest Link (2021–2022)
 Wheel of Fortune (1959–1962, no relation to later series of the same name)
 Who Wants to Be a Millionaire? (1999–2007)
 Who Wants to Be a Millionaire? Special Events (2021)
 Who Wants to Be a Millionaire? Whizz Kids (2010)
 Wipeout Australia (2009)

Children's

 The Adventures of Skippy (1992)
 Alice-Miranda Friends Forever (movie)
 BrainBuzz (2018–2021)
 The Breakky Club (1990–1991)
 The Bugs Bunny and Tweety Show (1990–1992)
 Bush Beat (2008–2010)
 Buzz Bumble (2014–2017)
 Captain Flinn and the Pirate Dinosaurs (2015–2019)
 The Cartoon Company (1986–1991)
 Cartoon Corner (1971–1977)
 The C Company (1990–1991)
 Challenger (1997–1998)
 The Channel Niners' Super Cartoon Show
 C'mon Kids
 The Cool Room
 Creature Mania (2018)
 Crocadoo (1996–1998)
 Crunch Time (2016–2018)
 The Curiosity Show (1972–1990)
 The Daryl and Ossie Cartoon Show (1977–1978)
 The Day My Butt Went Psycho! (2013–2019)
 Deadly (2006–2010)
 Dennis and Gnasher (2009–2017)
 Dinky Di's (1991)
 Dogstar (2006–2015)
 Don't Blame Me (2002–2003)
 The Dot and the Kangaroo films (1977–94)
 Double Trouble (2008)
 Download (2000–2002)
 The Eggs (2004–2009)
 Elly & Jools (1990, later aired on ABC Kids)
 Escape of the Artful Dodger
 Falcon Island (1981)
 Fanshaw & Crudnut (2017–2020)
 Flea Bitten (2012–2014)
 G2G: Got to Go (2008–2012)
 Gasp! (2011–2013)
 The Gift (1997, sometimes shares with ABC, now screening on ABC3)
 The Girl from Tomorrow (1990)
 The Girl from Tomorrow Part II: Tomorrow's End (1993)
 Go Health (1980–1985, sometimes shares with ABC)
 Goodsports (1992–2000)
 Groovedelicious (2007–2008)
 A gURLs wURLd (2011–2013)
 Heidi (2015–2019)
 Hills End
 Holly's Heroes (2005–2009)
 Hot Science
 Hot Source (2003–2007)
 Kangaroo Creek Gang (2002)
 Ketchup: Cats Who Cook (1997–1998, originally aired on Network Ten)
 Kids' Sunday
 Kids' WB (2006–2019)
 Kitchen Whiz (2011–2016)
 KTV
 Lab Rats Challenge (2008–2011)
 Lockie Leonard (2007–2008, 2010–2013)
 Match Mates (1981–1982)
 Mortified (2006–2008, 2010)
 Most Extreme Alien Planet Earth (2017)
 Move It! (2014–2018)
 Nate is Late (2018–2021)
 OK for Kids (1987–1989)
 The Ossie Ostrich Video Show (1984)
 Outriders (2001)
 Parallax (2004–2009)
 Pick Your Face (1999–2003)
 Pig's Breakfast (1999–2000)
 Pirate Express (2015–2021)
 Pixel Pinkie (2009–2013)
 Plucka's Place (1997)
 Professor Poopsnagle's Steam Zeppelin (1986)
 Pugwall (1989)
 Pugwall's Summer (1990–1991)
 Pyramid (2009–2015)
 Rimba's Island (1995–2002)
 The Saddle Club (2009–2012)
 The Shak (2006–2011)
 The Shapies (2002)
 Sharky's Friends (2007–2009)
 Ship to Shore (1993–1994, later airs on ABC, now airs on ABC3)
 The Skinner Boys (2014–2021)
 Skippy: Adventures in Bushtown (1998)
 Skippy the Bush Kangaroo (1966–1970)
 The Sleepover Club (2003–2008)
 Snake Tales (2009–2012)
 Snobs (2003)
 Space Chickens in Space (2018–2022)
 Spit MacPhee (1988)
 Stormworld (2009–2013)
 Streetsmartz (2005–2009)
 The Super Flying Fun Show
 Tarax Show (1957–1969)
 Timeblazers (2003–2009)
 The Toothbrush Family (1977–1999, two seasons, Season One later airs on ABC, Season Two originally airs on Network Ten)
 Wakkaville (2010–2013)
 What's Up Doc? (1991–1999)
 Wonder World! (1993–1995)
 Y? (1999–2002)
 Zoo Family (1985–1989)

Preschool
 Cushion Kids (2001–2002, 2005)
 Here's Humphrey (1965–2009)
 Hi-5 (1999–2012, 2017–2018)
 Hiccup & Sneeze (2017–2019)
 I Am Me (2020)
 Imagination Train (2015–2017)
 The Kingdom of Paramithi (2008–2010)
 New MacDonald's Farm (2004–2008)
 Surprises! (2012–2015, 2018–2020)
 Teddies (2017–2020)
 William & Sparkles' Magical Tales (2010–2017)
 Yamba's Playtime (2010–2015)

Music

 ABBAmania (2001, 2006)
 Accent on Strings (1956)
 The ARIA Music Show (2009)
 Bandstand (1958–1972)
 The Bert Newton Show (1959–1960)
 Bongo (1960, Melbourne only)
 Campfire Favourites (1956)
 Clipz (1983–1987, Brisbane only)
 Eclipse Music TV (2010–2013)
 Hillbilly Requests
 Juke Box Saturday Night
 MTV (1987–1993)
 Nine Presents (2003–2017)
 The Music Jungle (2007–2009)
 Neptune Presents (1957)
 Patrick O'Hagan Sings (1959, Melbourne only)
 Rockit (1985)
 Saturday Date (1963–1967)
 So Fresh (2003–2006)
 Wavelength

Sports talk

 Any Given Sunday (2005–2006)
 The Cricket Show (1997–2018)
 Boots N' All (2001–2005)
 The Footy Show (AFL) (1994–2019)
 The Footy Show (NRL) (1994–2018)
 The Sunday Roast (2005–2011)
 Wide World of Sports (1981–1999, 2008–2016)

Sports

 Australian rules football: AFL (2002–2006)
 Basketball: NBL (2007, 2015–2016, 2018–2019)
 Cricket: all domestic Test matches, One Day Internationals and Twenty20 Internationals (1972–2018)
 Cricket: World Series Cricket (1977–1979)
 Cycling: Tour Down Under (2012–2018)
 Horse racing: Melbourne Spring Racing Carnival (2007–2012), Autumn Racing Carnival (2007–2012)
 Rugby league: ANZAC Test  (1997–2017), Rugby League World Cup (1992–2008)
 Motor racing: A1 Grand Prix (2009), Formula One (1980–2002) including Australian Grand Prix (1985–2002) and Moto GP (1987–1996)
 Rugby union: The Rugby Championship (2011–2012), Wallabies Rugby Internationals (2011–2012), Rugby World Cup (2011, 2015)
 Soccer: FIFA World Cup (2002), International Champions Cup (2015–2016) and Socceroos World Cup Qualifiers (2016–2017 on 9Go!)
 Summer Olympic Games: London 2012 
 Swimming: Australian Swimming Championships (1985–2008), Pan Pacific Swimming Championships (1985–2008)
 Tennis: Fast4 Tennis (2015) and Masters Cup (2001)
 Winter Olympic Games: Vancouver 2010

Annual events
 Schools Spectacular (2013–2015)
 TV Week Logie Awards (1959, 1964, 1966, 1968–1980, 1982, 1984, 1986, 1988, 1991, 1994, 1996–2019, 2022, Moves to Seven in 2023)

Lotteries
 NSW Lotto Draws (NSW only, 5 November 1979 – 31 December 2012) (now broadcasting only on GO! 1 January 2013–)
 Tatts Keno Draws (Victoria only, 1980s–2009)

Foreign

News and current affairs
 20/20 (1981–2007, 2009–2019)
 48 Hours (1988, now screening on 10 Bold)
 Good Morning America (1978–2018)
 Primetime (2008)

Soap opera

 Another World (1990s)
 The Colbys (1985–1987)
 Dynasty (1981–1989)
 General Hospital (late 1980s)
 Loving (early 1980s)
 Search for Tomorrow (1951–1986)
 Titans

Animation

 Baby Blues
 Gary the Rat
 The Oblongs
 Ren & Stimpy "Adult Party Cartoon" 
 Stripperella (later moved to SBS)

Drama

 21 Jump Street (1987–1991)
 A.D. The Bible Continues (2015)
 Adventures in Rainbow Country (1970–1971)
 Arrow (9Go!)
 Another World (1964–1999)
 The Avengers (1961–1969, originally aired on ABC)
 The Baron (1966–1967)
 Bonanza (1959–1973)
 Brooklyn South (1997–1998)
 Buck Rogers in the 25th Century (1979–1981)
 Bull (2015)
 Burying Brian (2009)
 Cade's County (1971–1972)
 Captain Power and the Soldiers of the Future (1987–1988)
 Cashmere Mafia (2008)
 Charlie's Angels (1976–1981)
 Charlie's Angels (2011)
 Chase (2010)
 Chicago Justice (2017)
 China Beach (1988–1991)
 The Citadel (1983)
 City of Angels (2000)
 Close to Home (2006–2008)
 The Colbys (1985–1987)
 Cold Case (2003–2010)
 Cold Squad (1998–2005)
 Colditz (1972–1974)
 Columbo (1968–2003)
 The Commander (2009–2010, GEM 2011–2012)
 Coronation Street (1960–present)
 Crusoe (2009–2010)
 CSI: Crime Scene Investigation (2000–2015)
 CSI: Miami (2002–2012)
 CSI: NY (2004–2013)
 Damages (2007–2012)
 Danger Man (1960–1968)
 Dawson's Creek (2007–2009)
 Diagnosis: Murder (1993–2001)
 The Division (2001–2005)
 The Dukes of Hazzard (1979–1985)
 Dr. Quinn, Medicine Woman (1993–1998)
 Dynasty (1981–1989)
 Eleventh Hour (2009)
 Ellery Queen (1975–1976)
 ER (1994–2009)
 Everwood (2002–2006)
 The Evidence (2009)
 Eye to Eye (1985)
 The Fall Guy (1981–1986)
 Fantasy Island (1977–1984)
 Father Murphy (1981–1983)
 The F.B.I. (1965–1974)
 Forever (2015)
 The Fugitive (1963–1967)
 Gemini Man (1976)
 General Hospital (1963–present)
 Gideon's Way (1965–1966)
 Gilmore Girls (2001–2009, 2022–2026)
 Gossip Girl (2008–2009, now screening on GO! 2009–2012)
 Gotham (9Go!, now on Foxtel Networks)
 Gunsmoke (1955–1975)
 Harry's Law (Nine/GEM 2011–2012)
 Hart to Hart (1979–1982)
 Hawaii Five-O (1968–1980)
 Hello Goodbye (2006)
 Hill Street Blues (1981–1987, later airs on ABC)
 The Hills (2008–2009)
 Hostages (2013)
 Houston Knights (1987–1988)
 Invasion (2008)
 Jake and the Fatman (1987–1992)
 James at 15 (1978)
 James at 16 (1978)
 John Doe (2002–2003)
 Judging Amy (1999–2005)
 Katts and Dog (1988–1993)
 Kaz (1978–1979)
 Kidnapped (2006–2007)
 Knight Rider (1982–1986)
 Kojak (1973–1978)
 Kung Fu (1972–1975)
 The Last Ship (9Go!)
 Law & Order True Crime 
 Level 9 (2000–2001)
 Lethal Weapon (2017–2019)
 Lifestories: Families in Crisis (1992–1996)
 Little House on the Prairie (1974–1983)
 Lou Grant (1977–1982)
 Major Crimes (9Gem)
 Malibu (1983)
 Man From Atlantis (1978)
 Manions of America (1981)
 Mannix (1967–1975)
 Matlock (1986–1995)
 McCloud (1970–1977)
 Medicine Ball (1995)
 Men in Trees (2006–2008)
 The Mentalist (2008–2015)
 Miami Vice (1984–1990)
 Mission: Impossible (1966–1973)
 Mission: Impossible (1988–1990)
 Moonlight (2007–2008)
 Moonlighting (1985–1989)
 Murder, She Wrote (1985–1996)
 My Friend Flicka (1956–1957)
 The Mysteries of Laura
 The New Mike Hammer (1986–1987)
 The Nine (2006–2007)
 Nip/Tuck (2003–2010)
 Ohara (1987–1988)
 Outrageous Fortune (2006–2007, now screening on TEN)
 A Peaceable Kingdom (1989)
 Pensacola: Wings of Gold (1997–2000)
 Perry Mason (1957–1966)
 Petrocelli (1974–1976)
 Peyton Place (1964–1969)
 Poldark (1975–1977)
 Police Story (1973–1978)
 Police Woman (1974–1978)
 Prehistoric Park (2006; GO! 2012–present)
 Prime Suspect (2011)
 Prince Regent (1979)
 Remington Steele (1982–1987)
 Rizzoli & Isles (9Gem)
 Robin of Sherwood (1984–1986)
 Rome (2005–2007)
 Room 222 (1969–1974)
 Roots (1977)
 Roswell (1999–2002)
 Runaway (2006)
 Sam (1978)
 The Sandbaggers (1978–1980)
 Search for Tomorrow (1951–1986)
 Seaway (1965–1966)
 Shades of Darkness (1983–1986)
 Sherlock (2011–2012)
 Six Feet Under (2001–2005)
 Smallville (2002–2004, later moved to Network Ten and Eleven)
 Smith (2006–2007)
 The Sopranos (1999–2007) 
 Spenser: For Hire (1985–1988)
 Stalker (2015)
 Star Trek (1966–1969)
 Star Trek: Deep Space Nine (1993–1999)
 Star Trek: Enterprise (2001–2005)
 Star Trek: The Next Generation (1987–1994)
 Star Trek: Voyager (1995–2001)
 Starsky & Hutch (1975–1979)
 Studio 60 on the Sunset Strip (2007)
 St. Elsewhere (1982–1988)
 Superboy (1988–1992)
 S.W.A.T. (1975–1976)
 Taken
 Tales of the Unexpected (1979–1988)
 Tales of Wells Fargo (1957–1962)
 Terminator: The Sarah Connor Chronicles (2008) (previously on GO! 2009–2010)
 Third Watch (1999–2005)
 Today's F.B.I. (1981–1982)
 Touched by an Angel (1994–2003)
 Tucker's Witch (1982)
 Unforgettable (2011–2016)
 Upstairs, Downstairs (1971–1975)
 V (1983)
 V (2010, GO! 2010–2012)
 Vega$ (1978–1981)
 The Virginian (1962–1971)
 Voyage to the Bottom of the Sea  (1964–1968)
 Wagon Train (1957–1965)
 Waking the Dead (2000–2011)
 Walker, Texas Ranger (1993–2001)
 Walking Tall (1981)
 The West Wing (2000–2005, later moved to ABC)
 What I Like About You (2002–2006)
 Wiseguy (1987–1990)
 Without a Trace (2002–2009)
 Wonderfalls (2004)

Comedy

 2 Broke Girls (2011–2017)
 The Addams Family (1964–1966)
 ALF (1986–1990)
 Alice (1976–1985)
 The Andy Griffith Show (1960–1968)
 Anger Management (2012–2014)
 Angie (1979–1980)
 As Time Goes By (1992–2002)
 Baby Bob (2002–2003)
 Balls of Steel (2008)
 Barney Miller (1975–1982)
 Benson (1979–1986)
 The Bernie Mac Show (2001–2006)
 Better Together (2010)
 Bewitched (1964–1972)
 The Big Bang Theory (2007–2019)
 The Big C (2010–2013)
 Billy (1992)
 The Bob Newhart Show (1972–1978)
 The Brady Bunch (1969–1974)
 Can't Hurry Love (1995–1996)
 The Carol Burnett Show (1967–1978)
 Caroline in the City (1995–1999)
 The Charmings (1987–1988)
 Cheers (1982–1993)
 City (1990)
 The Cosby Show (1984–1992)
 Curb Your Enthusiasm (2000–2010)
 Cybill (1995–1998)
 The Danny Thomas Show (1953–1957)
 Dave's World (1993–1997)
 Dennis the Menace (1959–1963)
 Designing Women (1986–1993)
 Diagnosis: Murder (1993–2001)
 The Dick Van Dyke Show (1961–1966)
 Diff'rent Strokes (1978–1986)
 The Donna Reed Show (1958–1966)
 The Drew Carey Show (1995–2004)
 The Duck Factory (1984)
 The Edge (1992–1993)
 Empire (1984)
 Episodes (2011–2015, Now on ABC2)
 Eve (2003–2006)
 Family Affair (1966–1971)
 Family Matters (1989–1998)
 Family Ties (1983–1989)
 The Famous Teddy Z (1989–1990)
 Father Ted (1995–1998) 
 Fay (1975–1976)
 Foley Square (1985–1986)
 For Your Love (1998–2002)
 Frank's Place (1987–1988)
 Frasier (1993–2004)
 Free Spirit (1989–1990)
 The Fresh Prince of Bel-Air (1990–1996)
 Friends (1994–2004)
 Full House (1987–1995)
 Gilligan's Island (1964–1967)
 Gilmore Girls (2001–2009, 2022–2026)
 Gloria (1982–1983)
 Green Acres (1965–1971)
 The Gregory Hines Show (1997–1998)
 Growing Pains (1985–1992)
 Happy Days (1974–1984)
 Head of the Class (1986–1991)
 Here's Lucy (1968–1974)
 Hogan's Heroes (1965–1971)
 Hot in Cleveland (2010–2015)
 The Hughleys (1998–2002)
 I Dream of Jeannie (1965–1970)
 I Love Lucy (1951–1957)
 Ink (1996–1997)
 It's a Living (1980–1989)
 The Jack Benny Program (1950–1965)
 Jennifer Slept Here (1983–1984)
 Joey (2004–2006)
 Just Shoot Me! (2008–2009)
 Just the Ten of Us (1988–1990)
 Kevin Can Wait (2016–2018)
 Kids Say the Darndest Things (1995, 1998–2000)
 The King of Queens (1999–2007)
 Ladies' Men (1980–1981)
 Laverne & Shirley (1976–1983)
 Leave It to Beaver (1957–1963)
 Like Family (2003–2004)
 Little Britain (2009)
 Living Dolls (1989)
 Living with Fran (2005–2006)
 Love & War (1992–1995)
 The Love Boat (1977–1986)
 The Lucy Show (1962–1968)
 Mad TV (1995–2009)
 Malcolm in the Middle (2001–2005)
 Margie (1961–1962)
 Married... with Children (1987–1997)
 The Mary Tyler Moore Show (1970–1977)
 Maude (1972–1978)
 McHale's Navy (1962–1966)
 McMeego (1997)
 The Middle (2009–2018)
 Mike and Molly (2010–2016)
 Mork & Mindy (1978–1982)
 Mr. Merlin (1981–1982)
 The Muppet Show (1976–1981)
 Murphy Brown (1988–1998, Now on Ten)
 My Brother's Keeper (1975–1976)
 My Favorite Martian (1963–1966)
 My Sister Sam (1986–1988)
 My Three Sons (1965–1972)
 My Two Dads (1987–1990)
 The Nanny (2007–2009)
 Nanny and the Professor (1970–1971)
 The New Adventures of Old Christine (2006–2012)
 The New Odd Couple (1982–1983)
 Newhart (1982–1990)
 Nikki (2000–2002)
 The Norm Show (1999–2001)
 The Odd Couple (1970–1975)
 Off the Rack (1984–1985)
 The Parkers (1999–2004)
 Partners (Nine/GEM, 2014)
 The Partridge Family (1970–1974)
 Perfect Strangers (1986–1993)
 Reggie (1983)
 Rhoda (1974–1978)
 Room for Two (1992–1993)
 Sanford and Son (1972–1977)
 Seinfeld (1993, pilot episode only and later moved to Channel Ten at the end of the year)
 Sex and the City (1998–2004)
 Six Feet Under (2001–2005)
 Sledge Hammer! (1987–1988)
 Small Wonder (1985–1989)
 The Sopranos (1999–2007) 
 Spin City (1996–2002)
 Spitting Image (1984–1996)
 Sports Disasters
 Step by Step (1991–1997)
 Suddenly Susan (1996–2000)
 Taxi (1978–1983)
 Teech (1991)
 The Greatest American Hero (1982–1983)
 'Til Death (2007–2008)
 Tucker (2000)
 Two and a Half Men (2004–2015)
 Undateable (2014–2016)
 Undeclared (2001–2002)
 The Upper Hand (1990–1996)
 Veronica's Closet (1997–2000)
 Vinny and Bobby (1992)
 Viva Laughlin (2007)
 The Wackiest Ship in the Army (1965–1966)
 Wanda at Large (2003)
 We Got It Made (1984–1988)
 Webster (1983–1989)
 Weeds (2005–2012)
 Welcome Back, Kotter (1975–1979)
 Wings (1990–1997)
 Who's the Boss? (1984–1992)
 Whose Line Is It Anyway? (1998–2006)
 WKRP in Cincinnati (1978–1982)

Variety / entertainment

 The Ananda Lewis Show (1990s–2001)
 Dr. Phil (2002–2007, moved to 10)
 The Ellen DeGeneres Show (2008–2021)
 Entertainment Tonight (1981–2012, moved to 10)
 Extra (2012–2019)
 Late Show with David Letterman (1993–2006, moved to 10)
 Lip Sync Battle (2016–2020, Now on 10 Shake)
 The Martin Short Show (1999–2000)
 The View (2008–2013)
 Noel's House Party (1990s)

Reality

 American Idol (Season 18, 2020)
 American Ninja Warrior (Originally in 2010–2017 on SBS, 2018–2020 on 9Go!) 
 The Apprentice (2004–2006)
 The Bachelor (2002–2007) (GO! 2009, 2012)
 Britain's Got Talent (2015–2018, moved to Seven)
 Dance Your Ass Off (GO!, 2009)
 The F Word (2008)
 Girls of the Playboy Mansion (2007–2008)
 Hell's Kitchen (2007–2008)
 Ladette to Lady (2008)
 Neighbours at War (2007)
 Paradise Hotel
 Ramsay's Kitchen Nightmares (2007–2010)
 Secret Millionaire (2008)
 Supernanny (2005–2008)
 Superstars of Dance (2009–2010)
 The Truth About Food (2007–2008)
 Victoria Beckham: Coming to America (2007)
 The Voice Kids U.K  (2017–2018)
 Wife Swap (2007–2008) (GO! 2009–2010, GEM 201–2011)
 World of Dance (2018)

Lifestyle

 Bargain Hunt (2007–2008, now screening on 7TWO)
 Body Work
 Extreme Makeover (2002–2007)
 Wine Me, Dine Me (2007)
 You Are What You Eat (2004–2007)

Observational / documentaries

 The Agency (2001–2003)
 Airline (2006–2008)
 Airport (1996–2008)
 Deadly Surf (2007–2008)
 Emergency (2008)
 Hot Pursuit (2010)
 i-Caught (2007)
 Life in Cold Blood (2008)
 Embarrassing Bodies
 Mortal Kombat: Konquest (1998–1999)
 Motorway Patrol (2001–2010, Now on Seven)
 Police Ten 7 (2006–2008)
 Richard Hammond's Invisible Worlds (2010)
 A Year with the Royal Family (2008)

Game shows

 Banzai
 The Cube (2010, now airs on GO! 2012–)
 Eggheads (9Gem 2016–2017)
 The Moment of Truth (2008)
 Wipeout (2008) (GO! 2009–2012, later on 7mate)

Anthology
 Disneyland
 The Wonderful World of Disney (9Go! 2019–2020, moving to Disney+ in 2020)

Children's

 8 Man
 Ace Ventura: Pet Detective
 Adventure Time (2011–2020)
 The Adventures of Batman & Robin
 Adventures of the Little Koala
 The Adventures of Noddy
 The Adventures of Rin Tin Tin
 The Adventures of Super Mario Bros. 3
 The Adventures of Twizzle (Victoria only, usually airs on Seven Network in New South Wales)
 The Amazing 3
 The Amazing Chan and the Chan Clan (later aired on Seven Network)
 Animaniacs (later aired on GO!)
 The Archie Show
 Ark II
 Astro Boy (1960s version except Melbourne)
 Barbie Dreamtopia
 Baby Looney Tunes
 Baggy Pants and the Nitwits
 Bailey's Comets
 The Baker Street Boys
 Ballet Shoes
 The Bang Shang Lollapalooza Show
 The Barkleys
 The Batman 
 Batman: The Animated Series
 Batman: The Brave and the Bold
 The Beagles
 Beakman's World (shares with Network Ten)
 The Beatles
 Be Cool, Scooby-Doo! (2016–2019)
 Beetlejuice
 Ben 10 (2005 series)
 Ben 10 (2016 series) (2017–2019)
 Ben 10: Alien Force 
 Ben 10: Omniverse
 Ben 10: Ultimate Alien 
 Beware the Batman
 Big Blue Marble
 Big John, Little John
 Bimble's Bucket
 Birdman and the Galaxy Trio (later aired on Seven Network)
 The Biskitts
 The Book Tower
 The Box of Delights
 The Bozo Show
 Brambly Hedge (later aired on ABC)
 BraveStarr
 Buford and the Galloping Ghost
 The Bugs Bunny Show (sometimes shares with Seven Network and Network Ten)
 Camp Lazlo
 Captain America
 The Care Bears Movie
 The Care Bears Movie II: A New Generation
 Cartoon All-Stars to the Rescue (Simulcast with Seven Network and Network Ten)
 Casper the Friendly Ghost
 Challenge of the GoBots (only airs on Nine in Adelaide, usually airs on Seven Network)
 The Charlie Brown and Snoopy Show (later aired on ABC)
 Chucklewood Critters
 Classic Looney Tunes
 Clue Club (later aired on Seven Network)
 Codename: Kids Next Door (later aired on Nine HD and GO!, also airs on Seven Network in Perth)
 Cool McCool
 C.O.P.S. (later aired on Network Ten)
 Courage the Cowardly Dog
 Courageous Cat and Minute Mouse
 Crusader Rabbit
 Daktari
 Dastardly and Muttley in Their Flying Machines (later aired on Network Ten and Seven Network)
 Denver, the Last Dinosaur
 Deputy Dawg
 Devlin
 Dexter's Laboratory (originally aired on Seven Network)
 The Dick Tracy Show
 Dingbat and the Creeps
 Digimon Fusion
 Dinky Dog
 Dinosaucers
 Dynomutt, Dog Wonder (later aired on Seven Network)
 Ed, Edd n Eddy (originally aired on Seven Network)
 The Edison Twins
 Electric Eskimo
 Elephant Boy
 Fabulous Funnies
 The Famous Adventures of Mr. Magoo
 The Fantastic Voyages of Sinbad the Sailor
 The Flintstones (1960–1966)
 Follyfoot
 The Fonz and the Happy Days Gang
 Freakazoid!
 Free Willy
 The Funky Phantom (later aired on Seven Network)
 The Funny Company
 Galaxy Goof-Ups
 Garfield Specials
 The Gary Coleman Show
 Gazula the Amicable Monster
 Gentle Ben
 The Ghost Busters
 Go Go Gophers
 The Great Grape Ape Show (later aired on Seven Network)
 The Grim Adventures of Billy & Mandy
 Grimm's Fairy Tale Classics
 Groovie Ghoulies (shares with Seven Network and Network Ten)
 Gumby (later aired on Seven Network and ABC)
 H.R. Pufnstuf
 The Hallo Spencer Show
 The Harlem Globetrotters
 The Harveytoons Show
 Heathcliff
 Heckle and Jeckle
 Help!... It's the Hair Bear Bunch!
 The Herculoids (later aired on Seven Network)
 Here Come the Double Deckers
 Hero High
 Hey Vern, It's Ernest!
 Heyyy, It's the King!
 Hi Hi Puffy AmiYumi
 Histeria!
 Hong Kong Phooey (later aired on Seven Network)
 Hoppity Hooper
 Hot Wheels
 Hound Town
 The Houndcats
 Huckleberry Hound (usually airs on Seven Network in Victoria, sometimes airs on Nine in Sydney)
 Inch High, Private Eye (later aired on Seven Network)
 The Incredible Hulk
 Jabberjaw (later aired on Seven Network)
 Jana of the Jungle
 Jason of Star Command
 Johnny Bravo (originally aired on Seven Network)
 Johnny Cypher in Dimension Zero
 Johnny Test
 Josie and the Pussycats (later aired on Seven Network)
 Josie and the Pussycats in Outer Space (later aired on Seven Network)
 Justice League
 Justice League Action
 Justice League Unlimited
 The Karate Kid 
 Kidd Video
 The King Kong Show
 King Leonardo and His Short Subjects (originally aired on ABC)
 Korg: 70,000 B.C.
 The Krofft Supershow
 Lancelot Link, Secret Chimp
 Laverne & Shirley in the Army
 The Legend of Zelda
 Lego Marvel Super Heroes (2019)
 Lidsville
 The Life and Times of Juniper Lee
 Little Charmers
 Littlest Pet Shop
 Littlest Pet Shop: A World of Our Own
 Lippy the Lion
 The Littles (later aired on Network Ten)
 The Lone Ranger
 The Looney Tunes Show (2009–2010)
 The Lost Saucer
 Magilla Gorilla (originally aired on Network Ten as Channel 0, later aired on Seven Network)
 Marine Boy (later aired on Network Ten)
 Marvel's Avengers Assemble (2019)
 The Marvel Super Heroes
 M.A.S.K. (later aired on Network Ten)
 Meatballs & Spaghetti
 Merrie Melodies (shared with Seven Network and Network Ten)
 The Mickey Mouse Club (usually airs on Seven Network)
 The Mighty Hercules
 Mighty Mouse
 Mighty Mouse: The New Adventures
 Mighty Mouse Playhouse
 Mike, Lu & Og
 Milton the Monster (later aired on Network Ten)
 Moby Dick and Mighty Mightor
 Monchhichis
 Mork & Mindy/Laverne & Shirley/Fonz Hour
 The Mouse Factory
 Mr. Magoo
 ¡Mucha Lucha!
 Muggsy
 The Mumbly Cartoon Show (later aired on Seven Network)
 My Little Pony 'n Friends
 The New Adventures of Mighty Mouse and Heckle & Jeckle
 The New Adventures of Superman
 The New Adventures of Zorro
 The New Archie and Sabrina Hour
 The New Archies (later aired on Network Ten)
 The New Casper Cartoon Show
 New Looney Tunes
 The New Mickey Mouse Club (usually airs on Seven Network)
 The New Scooby-Doo Movies (later aired on Seven Network)
 The Oddball Couple
 Ox Tales
 Ozzy & Drix
 Pandamonium
 The Paper Lads
 Peanuts specials (later aired on ABC)
 Regal Academy
 The Perils of Penelope Pitstop
 Phantoma
 The Pink Panther (usually airs on Network Ten, airs on Nine in Brisbane, later aired on Seven Network)
 Pinky and the Brain (later aired on GO!)
 Pinky, Elmyra & the Brain 
 Police Academy: The Animated Series
 Popeye the Sailor
 Popples
 The Porky Pig Show (sometimes shares with Seven Network and Network Ten)
 The Powerpuff Girls (2016 series)
 Power Rangers Samurai
 Power Rangers Super Samurai
 Power Rangers Megaforce
 Power Rangers Super Megaforce
 Power Rangers Dino Charge
 Power Rangers Super Dino Charge
 Power Rangers Ninja Steel
 Power Rangers Super Ninja Steel
 Power Rangers Beast Morphers
 Prezzemolo
 Prince Planet
 The Princess and the Goblin
 Quick Draw McGraw (usually airs on Seven Network in Victoria, sometimes airs on Nine in Sydney)
 Regular Show (2014–2020)
 The Real Ghostbusters (originally aired on Network Ten)
 Richie Rich
 Road Rovers
 The Road Runner Show (sometimes shares with Seven Network)
 Robotech (airs on Nine only in Adelaide, usually airs on Network Ten, later aired on Seven Network)
 Robocar Poli
 Rocky and Bullwinkle (later aired on ABC)
 The Ruff & Reddy Show (also airs on Seven Network)
 Saban's Adventures of the Little Mermaid
 Saban’s Gulliver’s Travels
 Samurai Jack
 Sammy's Super T-Shirt
 Scooby and Scrappy-Doo (later aired on Seven Network)
 Scooby-Doo! Mystery Incorporated
 The Scooby-Doo Show (later aired on Seven Network)
 Scooby-Doo, Where Are You? (later aired on Seven Network)
 Scooby's All-Star Laff-A-Lympics (later aired on Seven Network)
 The Secret Lives of Waldo Kitty (originally aired on Network Ten)
 The Secrets of Isis
 Shaggy & Scooby-Doo Get a Clue! (2009–2010)
 Shazzan (later aired on Seven Network)
 Sheep in the Big City
 Sherlock Hound
 Siegfried & Roy: Masters of the Impossible
 Sigmund and the Sea Monsters
 The Skatebirds (later aired on Seven Network)
 Sky Pirates
 Slimer! and the Real Ghostbusters
 Snacker
 Snorks (only airs on Nine in Adelaide, usually airs on Seven Network)
 Space Academy
 Space Ace
 Space Angel
 Space Ghost (sometimes airs on Network Ten, later aired on Seven Network)
 The Space Kidettes (later aired on Seven Network)
 Space Sentinels
 Spider-Man
 SpongeBob SquarePants (2015–17, now on 10 Shake)
 Sport Billy
 Spunky and Tadpole
 Star Trek: The Animated Series (1973–1974)
 Star Wars: Droids (only airs on Nine in Perth, usually airs on Network Ten)
 Star Wars Rebels (2019)
 Static Shock
 Steven Universe
 The Super Mario Bros. Super Show!
 Super Mario World
 Supergran
 Superman
 Superman: The Animated Series
 Superwitch
 The Sylvester & Tweety Mysteries
 Tales of the Wizard of Oz
 Tangled: The Series (2019)
 Taz-Mania 
 Teen Titans
 Teen Wolf
 Tennessee Tuxedo and His Tales
 These Are the Days
 Thunderbirds (1965–1966)
 Thunderbirds Are Go (shared with ABC ME)
 ThunderCats (1985) (only airs on Nine in Adelaide, usually airs on Seven Network in Sydney (first aired on Seven in Sydney and other states in 1986 and later in Victoria in 1989) and Network Ten in Victoria from 1987 to 1988)
 ThunderCats (2011) (later aired on GO!)
 Time Squad
 Tiny Toon Adventures
 Tom and Jerry Tales
 Toonsylvania
 Tom Terrific (sometimes airs on Seven Network in Victoria)
 Top Cat (later aired on Seven Network and GO!, airs on Network Ten in Adelaide)
 Touché Turtle and Dum Dum (sometimes airs on Seven Network in Victoria)
 Transformers: Cyberverse
 Turning Mecard (2017–2019)
 Uncle Croc's Block (sometimes shares with Seven Network)
 Uncle Grandpa
 Valley of the Dinosaurs
 Wacky Races (later aired on Network Ten and Seven Network)
 Wally Gator
 Walt Disney's Mickey and Donald
 We Bare Bears
 What's New, Scooby-Doo?
 Where's Huddles?
 Wild West C.O.W.-Boys of Moo Mesa
 Wishbone
 Woody Woodpecker
 Woof! (later aired on ABC and 7TWO)
 The World of Strawberry Shortcake
 Wowser
 X-Men: Evolution
 Xiaolin Showdown 
 Yogi's Space Race
 Yo-kai Watch (2015–2018)
 Young Justice (2012–2019)
 Yu-Gi-Oh!
 Yu-Gi-Oh! Arc-V (2015–2019)
 Yu-Gi-Oh! VRAINS (2019–2021)
 Yu-Gi-Oh! Zexal (2014–2017, 9Go!)
 The Zeta Project

Preschool

 The Backyardigans (2004–10)
 Barney & Friends (1992–09)
 Blue's Clues 
 Bubble Guppies (2012–14, moved to 10 Shake)
 Clifford the Big Red Dog
 Dora the Explorer (2000–18, moved to 10 Shake)
 Go, Diego, Go! (2005–10)
 Jack's Big Music Show (2005–14)
 Jay Jay the Jet Plane (1998–05)
 Kate & Mim-Mim
 Little Red Tractor (2004–07)
 The Lion Guard (2019)
 Make Way for Noddy (2002–07)
 Mickey and the Roadster Racers (2019)
 PAW Patrol (2014–2020, shared with 10 Shake)
 Percy the Park Keeper (later aired on ABC)
 Playbox
 Puppy Dog Pals (2019)
 Rainbow (also airs on Seven Network and Network Ten)
 Sofia the First (2019)
 Team Umizoomi (2012, moved to 10 Shake)
 Vampirina (2019)

Sports
 American football: NFL including Super Bowl (early 1990s-mid 1990s)
 Baseball: Major League Baseball including World Series (1980s–1990s, 2014)
 Netball: Suncorp Super Netball and Constellation Cup (2017–2021) on Nine/9Gem)
 Tennis: French Open (2003–2009)

Annual events
 Academy Awards (now on Seven)

Religious
 Kenneth Copeland
 Life Today with James Robison (Shared with Network Ten, now on 7flix)

Other
 Beyond with James Van Praagh
 Body Doubles
 Farscape 
 Look Who's Talking
 Mortal Kombat: Konquest
 The Samurai
 The Three Stooges

See also

 List of programs broadcast by ABC Television
 List of programs broadcast by Network 10
 List of programs broadcast by Special Broadcasting Service
 List of programs broadcast by Seven Network
 List of Australian television series

Notes

References

External links

Nine Network

Nine Network